Les Aventures de Colargol is an animated television series which ran for 53 episodes of 13 minutes each, created by Albert Barillé after the Colargol created by Olga Pouchine and broadcast from November 9,  to 1974 on the Deuxième chaîne de l’ORTF. The series has been successfully exported to many countries.

In Quebec, it was broadcast in the fall of 1973 in the "Bagatelle" program block on Télévision de Radio-Canada.

Background 

In 1969, Albert Barillé, independent producer, financed the series himself (in the face of opposition by French channel  ORTF) and entrusted the production to Tadeusz Wilkosz, founder of the Polish studio Se-ma-for.

Synopsis

The happy and singing adventures of a bear cub named Colargol whose only desire is to sing. Unfortunately, he doesn't have the talent for it.

Episodes

References

External links

 
 

1960s French animated television series
1970s French animated television series
1968 French television series debuts
1975 French television series endings
French children's animated adventure television series
French television shows featuring puppetry
Animated television series about bears
Television shows featuring puppetry
Polish children's animated television series
Office de Radiodiffusion Télévision Française original programming